Amit Mishra (born 11 November 1991) is an Indian cricketer who plays for Uttar Pradesh cricket team in domestic cricket. He is a right-arm Medium-Fast bowler who was a member of the Rajasthan Royals squad for 2014 Indian Premier League. He has played for Central Zone cricket team.

References

External links
 

Indian cricketers
Living people
1991 births
Uttar Pradesh cricketers
Rajasthan Royals cricketers
Central Zone cricketers
Sportspeople from Kanpur
Gujarat Lions cricketers